John Francis Hardiman (27 July 1877 – 17 November 1955) was an Australian rules footballer who played with Geelong and Richmond in the Victorian Football League (VFL).

Notes

External links 

1877 births
1955 deaths
Australian rules footballers from Geelong
Geelong Football Club players
Richmond Football Club players